Barry Mason FRBS (born 1952, Epsom, Surrey, England) is a British sculptor who specialises in sculpture using water and light.

Biography
Mason studied fine art at Reading University (1970– 74, and at the Slade, University College London (1974–76). He acquired the skills to realise many of these pieces by studying stonemasonry at Bath Technical College (1980–81) where he gained City and Guilds Craft and Advanced craft qualifications. This also enabled him to support his sculpture practice by part-time work as a stonemason. He lives and works in Gloucestershire.

Works
He has completed several large pieces, which are accessible to the public, as well as many more in private collections in Britain and abroad. These include THALES commissioned by the Crown Estate and presented to Queen Elizabeth II as the centrepiece of the Jubilee Garden in the Savill Garden in Windsor Great Park, HALF MOON in the grounds of Eton College and SPHERE at the Hurlingham Club in London. His earliest large sculptures were conceived to be installed in landscape rather than art gallery settings, and used sunlight and shadow as an integral and dynamic element in their composition (the HELIOS series).
 
Most of Mason's recent work has been commissioned privately for gardens in England, Scotland, Spain and Germany. Highlights include VESSICA in a gold medal winning garden at Chelsea Flower Show, designed my Mark Anthony Walker. THALES for the Abbey House Gardens in Malmesbury (open to the public).

Mason has always had a parallel passion for music, and discovered the world of the gong, sound therapy and healing about fifteen years ago. He has been fortunate to collaborate with several leading gong practitioners playing handpan and other percussion instruments alongside the gongs.
Over the last decade few experimental sound sculptures have been produced, using wind and water, but more recently Mason has been making gongs and other instruments specifically designed for use in sound therapy. 
Early gongs were made from stainless steel, brass and copper, but a fortunate encounter with a titanium gong in 2020 set the path for future experiments. 
Recent work has been installed in the “Gillyflower” at Elmore Court, and future commissions are in progress for Holland and Mexico.

References

1952 births
Living people
British sculptors
British male sculptors
People from Epsom